Evergreen (formerly known as We Were Evergreen) are a French indie pop duo. The band formed in Paris in 2008 but have been based in London, UK, since 2011.
They've been described as "shape-shifting pop blend[ing] folk melodies, electro beats and exotic rhythms".
Their debut album, Towards, was released on 5 May 2014. Their second album, Overseas, was released on 15 June 2018.

History
The band was formed in 2008 in Paris by then-literature-students Michael Liot (vocals, strummed instruments) and Fabienne Débarre (vocals, keyboards, xylophone). They were very quickly joined by William Serfass (vocals, percussions, bass, electric guitar).
After releasing two self-produced EPs (We Were Evergreen, Flings) in France, they moved to London where they released a third EP, Leeway.  

Evergreen wrote and recorded the soundtrack to 2013 French film Fonzy.

William Serfass left the band between the release of their second album, Overseas (2018), and their single, Quarantine (2020).

The band signed with Moshi Moshi Records in 2021

Discography

EP
 We Were Evergreen - 2010
 Flings - 2010
 Leeway - 2013
 Aux Echos - 2017
 Sign In - 2021

Albums

 Towards - 2014
 Overseas - 2018
 Sign Out - 2023

Towards was released on 5 May 2014 by Island Records in the UK and Because Music in France, Belgium and Switzerland.
It was recorded and mixed in Brixton's Iguana Studios, with Charlie Andrew (producer of Alt-J, Sivu and Marika Hackman).

The album was described as "smart pop that keeps its charm" (Clash), "considered but playful" (The 405), "a sublime, varied LP that's a perfect accompaniment to the impending sun-pecked skies" (music OMH).

The first three singles from the album were 'Daughters', 'False Start' and 'Best Thing'. The video for 'Daughters', directed by Dominique Rocher, is a take on the Danaids myth based on overlapping choreography, and shot in a single take as well as a single room.

Singles

References

External links
 Record label

Musical groups from Paris
Musical groups established in 2008
2008 establishments in France
French indie pop groups
French musical trios